Sarah Fuller may refer to:
 Sarah Fuller (athlete) (born 1999), American soccer player and football kicker 
 Sarah Fuller (educator) (1836–1927), American educator of the deaf
 Sarah Margaret Fuller or Margaret Fuller  (1810–1850), American journalist, critic and women's rights activist

See also
 Sarah Fuller Flower Adams (1805–1848), English poet